The Sri Lanka national cricket team toured Pakistan from 6 October to 28 November 2004. The tour consisted of two Test matches.

Paktel Cup

Paktel Cup was a One Day International triangular cricket tournament, played amongst Pakistan, Sri Lanka and Zimbabwe. The tournament was held in Pakistan from 30 September 2004 to 16 October 2004. The tournament consisted of a round-robin stage, in which each nation played the others two times each. The top two teams (Pakistan and Sri Lanka) participated in the final of the series.

Test series

1st Test

2nd Test

References

External links
Sri Lanka tour of Pakistan, 2004/05

2004 in Pakistani cricket
2004 in Sri Lankan cricket
International cricket competitions in 2004–05
Pakistani cricket seasons from 2000–01
2004–05